Hasin, also rendered as Hasun, may refer to:
 Həsin, Azerbaijan
 Hasin-e Bozorg, Iran
 Hasin-e Kuchak, Iran